Jerry Butler (born 1939) is an American soul singer and Chicago politician.

Jerry Butler may also refer to:

Jerry Butler (actor) (1959–2018), 1980s American pornographic actor
Jerry Butler (American football) (born 1957), former NFL wide receiver
Jerry Butler (ice hockey) (born 1951), Canadian professional ice hockey player
Jerry Butler (Texas politician) (1929–1979), American politician in the Texas House of Representatives

See also
Gerald Butler (disambiguation)